Emma (born Emma Louise Booth, 2 August 1974) is a Welsh singer, who sang the UK entry, "Give a Little Love Back to the World", in the Eurovision Song Contest 1990.

This was the third of four entries representing the UK composed by Paul Curtis. The song finished sixth in the Contest, and climbed to No. 33 in the UK Singles Chart. Her backing vocalists at Eurovision 1990 included Sam Blue and Miriam Stockley.

Biography
Emma was born in Bridgend, Wales. At fifteen, she was the youngest singer to have represented the UK in the contest and only narrowly made the newly implemented age rule in the competition, where all contestants must be 16 in the year they compete. The song had an environmental theme. Many of the 1990 entries chose the momentous events taking place across Europe in the previous twelve months and European Unity as their theme. She released one more single in the UK on Big Wave Records. It was 1991's "Dance All Night" which failed to chart.

Personal life
Booth now lives in Seattle, with her husband and children. Her father, John Booth, is an actor and acts alongside Owen Money in yearly pantomimes. Her sisters, Amy and Kristie, now run a dance school in South Wales. The dance school, KLA, featured on series 1 of The Greatest Dancer where they finished in 2nd place.

Discography

Singles

References

External links
 

1974 births
Living people
Eurovision Song Contest entrants for the United Kingdom
Eurovision Song Contest entrants of 1990
People from Bridgend
20th-century Welsh women singers